Sweethearts of the Rodeo is the debut studio album by American country music duo Sweethearts of the Rodeo. Five of the tracks would rise into the Billboard Hot Country Singles chart. "Midnight Girl/Sunset Town" and "Chains of Gold" both achieved a #4 rating, while "Since I Found You" made it to #7, "Gotta Get Away" to #10, and a cover of "Hey Doll Baby", made famous by the Everly Brothers, was at #21.

Critical reception

In his Allmusic review, critic Mark Humphrey called the album "good vocal harmony on contemporary, rock-tinged country."

Track listing

Personnel
 Michael Rhodes – bass
 Eddie Bayers – drums
 Harry Stinson – louvinturn
 Roy Huskey Jr. – upright bass
 Billy Joe Walker Jr. – guitar
 Gregg Galbraith – guitar
 Janis Gill – guitar
 Larry Byrom – guitar
 Steve Gibson – guitar, mandolin
 Vince Gill – guitar
 David Innis – keyboards
 John Jarvis – keyboards
 Shane Keister – keyboards
 Hank DeVito – steel guitar

Chart performance

References

Sweethearts of the Rodeo albums
1986 debut albums
Columbia Records albums
Albums produced by Steve Buckingham (record producer)